The 1964 Limerick Senior Hurling Championship was the 70th staging of the Limerick Senior Hurling Championship since its establishment by the Limerick County Board in 1887.

Feenagh-Kilmeedy were the defending champions.

Cappamore won the championship after a 5-05 to 1-04 defeat of Dromcollogher in the final. It was their fifth championship title overall and their first title in five years. It remains their last championship triumph.

References

Limerick Senior Hurling Championship
Limerick Senior Hurling Championship